Lifeline is a 1997 Hong Kong action disaster drama film directed by Johnnie To and starring Sean Lau, Alex Fong and Carman Lee.

Plot
Yau Sui (Sean Lau) is a veteran firefighter of the Tsz Wan Shan Fire Station who has an arrogant attitude because of his extensive experience. By chance, Sui meets Annie (Carman Lee), a doctor who becomes troublous after a recent breakup with her boyfriend. Sui consoles her and they begin a relationship. Meanwhile, Sui strikes a rivalry with the newly appointed leader of the fire station, Raymond Cheung (Alex Fong), often getting into disputes. Later, a big fire erupts in a weaving factory located in Tsuen Wan, where Sui, Raymond and their team members arrive to the scene, where the fire level rose to 5th alarm. Because of many hazardous objects present, an explosion occurs, releasing toxic gas. To deal with the dilemma, Sui and Raymond must put their rivalry aside and work together.

Cast
Sean Lau as  Principal Fireman Yau Sui (有水) 
Alex Fong as Senior Station Officer Raymond Cheung (張文傑)
Carman Lee as Dr. Annie Chan
Damian Lau as Cheng Fu-wai (鄭富威), Chief Fire Officer
Ruby Wong as Probationary Station Officer Lo Ka-wai (盧嘉慧)
Raymond Wong Ho-yin as Fireman Wong Ho-yin (黃浩然) 
Chan Man-lei as Ho-yin's father
Yuen Bun as Station Officer Fong Ting-kwok
Lam Suet as Arsonist
Kenneth Chan as Annie's boyfriend
Patrick Dunn as Madam Lo's husband
Eileen Yeow as Janet
Annabelle Lau as Factory worker trapped in fire
Yuen Ling-to as Factory manager
Sin Kam-ching
Lau man-yee
Kwok Yee-kiu
Cyrus Wong
Lam Kwok-kit as Firefighter
Lu Ching-ting as Firefighter
Hung Wai-leung as Construction worker
Chiu Chi-shing

Reception

Critical
Beyond Hollywood gave the film a positive review praising the developed characters and the performances of Sean Lau and Alex Fong, while also noting its impressive fire stunts. LoveHKFilm gave the film a positive review and praises director Johnnie To's realism and sheer bravura storytelling. So Good Reviews also gave a positive review, praising the fire sequences and characters, but criticizes some of its melodramatic moments.

Box office
The film grossed HK$20,730,867 at the Hong Kong box office during its theatrical run from 3 January to 4 February 1997.

Awards and nominations

References

External links

Lifeline at Hong Kong Cinemagic

1997 films
1997 action films
1990s action drama films
Hong Kong action drama films
Hong Kong disaster films
Films about firefighting
1990s Cantonese-language films
Shaw Brothers Studio films
Films directed by Johnnie To
Films set in Hong Kong
Films shot in Hong Kong
Films with screenplays by Yau Nai-hoi
1997 drama films
1990s Hong Kong films